Elbridge Van Syckel Besson (December 22, 1839 – 1915) was an American Republican Party politician who served two non-consecutive terms as the 14th and 16th Mayor of Hoboken, New Jersey. He also served a term in the New Jersey General Assembly.

Biography
Besson was born on December 22, 1839, in Hoboken, New Jersey to Jacob Besson and Sarah Carhart Runkle. He was President of the Hoboken City Council in 1865. He was a member of New Jersey General Assembly in 1869. Besson was the Republican nominee for mayor again in 1884 and 1895. He died in 1915.

References

Mayors of Hoboken, New Jersey
1839 births
1915 deaths
Republican Party members of the New Jersey General Assembly
19th-century American politicians